Qatar hosted and participated in the 3rd West Asian Games held in Doha from December 1, 2005 to December 10, 2005. Qatar ranked 1st with 28 gold medals in this edition of the West Asian Games.

References

West Asian Games
Nations at the 2005 West Asian Games
Qatar at the West Asian Games